Indian Telly Award for Best Actor in a Lead Role Female is an award given by IndianTelevision as part of its annual Indian Telly Awards for TV serials.

The award was first awarded in 2002. A special award called Best Actress Critics or Best Actress Jury is also awarding occasionally, whose winner was selected by the jury of critics assigned to the function.

The jury award was awarded without prior nominations until 2012. Since then, the jury award is also awarded with prior nominations.

Superlatives

Popular Award

2000s
2001Not Awarded
2002Smriti Irani for Kyunki Saas Bhi Kabhi Bahu Thi as Tulsi Virani.
Iravati Harshe for Ankahee as Anjali
Mauli Ganguly for Kaahin Kissii Roz as Shaina Sikand
Renuka Shahane for Kora Kagaz as Pooja
Sakshi Tanwar for Kahaani Ghar Ghar Kii as Parvati Agarwal
Shweta Tiwari for Kasautii Zindagii Kay as Prerna Bajaj
Manasi Salvi for Kohi Apna Sa as Khushi Vishal Gill
Simone Singh for Heena as Heena Mirza
2003Smriti Irani for Kyunki Saas Bhi Kabhi Bahu Thi as Tulsi Virani & Sakshi Tanwar for Kahaani Ghar Ghar Kii as Parvati Agarwal.
Shweta Tiwari for Kasautii Zindagii Kay as Prerna Bajaj
Gurdeep Kohli for Sanjivani as Dr. Juhi Singh
Niki Aneja for Astitva...Ek Prem Kahani as Dr. Simran Mathur
Sangeeta Ghosh for Des Mein Niklla Hoga Chand as Parminder "Pammi" Kaur
Simone Singh for Heena as Heena Mirza
2004Mona Singh for Jassi Jaissi Koi Nahin as Jasmeet Walia.
Aamna Shariff for Kahiin To Hoga as Kashish Garewal
Niki Aneja for Astitva...Ek Prem Kahani as Dr. Simran Mathur
Shweta Tiwari for Kasautii Zindagii Kay as Prerna Bajaj
Sangeeta Ghosh for Des Mein Niklla Hoga Chand as Parminder "Pammi" Kaur
Shama Sikander for Ye Meri Life Hai as Pooja Malhotra
Smriti Irani for Kyunki Saas Bhi Kabhi Bahu Thi as Tulsi Virani
2005Mona Singh for Jassi Jaissi Koi Nahin as Jassi.
Aamna Shariff for Kahiin To Hoga as Kashish Garewal
Juhi Parmar for Kumkum – Ek Pyara Sa Bandhan as Kumkum Wadhwa
Shweta Tiwari for Kasautii Zindagii Kay as Prerna Bajaj
Natassha for Kkavyanjali as Anjali Kkavya Nanda
Sakshi Tanwar for Kahaani Ghar Ghar Kii as Parvati Agarwal
Shama Sikander for Ye Meri Life Hai as Pooja Malhotra
Smriti Irani – Kyunki Saas Bhi Kabhi Bahu Thi as Tulsi Virani
2006Aamna Shariff for Kahiin To Hoga as Kashish Garewal & Anita Hassanandani for Kkavyanjali as Anjali Nanda.
Kanchi Kaul for Ek Ladki Anjaani Si as Ananya Sachdev
Sakshi Tanwar for Kahaani Ghar Ghar Kii as Parvati Agarwal
Sangeeta Ghosh for Viraasat as Priyanka Kharbanda
Sarita Joshi for Baa Bahoo Aur Baby as Godavari "Baa" Thakkar
Shweta Tiwari for Kasautii Zindagii Kay as Prerna Bajaj
Smriti Irani for Kyunki Saas Bhi Kabhi Bahu Thi as Tulsi Virani
2007Prachi Desai for Kasamh Se as Bani Walia & Rajshree Thakur for Saat Phere as Saloni Singh.
Divyanka Tripathi for Banoo Main Teri Dulhann as Vidya Singh
Gautami Kapoor for Kyunki Saas Bhi Kabhi Bahu Thi as Tulsi Virani
Juhi Parmar for Kumkum – Ek Pyara Sa Bandhan as Kumkum Wadhwa
Priyanka Bassi for Left Right Left as Cadet Naina Singh Ahluwalia
Sakshi Tanwar for Kahaani Ghar Ghar Kii as Parvati Agarwal
Shweta Tiwari for Kasautii Zindagii Kay as Prerna Bajaj
Smriti Zubin Irani for Virrudh as Vasudha
2008Parul Chauhan for Sapna Babul Ka...Bidaai as Ragini Rajvanshi & Sara Khan for Sapna Babul Ka...Bidaai as Sadhana Rajvansh.
Additi Gupta for Kis Desh Mein Hai Meraa Dil as Heer Juneja
Avika Gor for Balika Vadhu as Anandi
Divyanka Tripathi for Banoo Main Teri Dulhann as Vidya Singh/Divya
Shubhangi Atre for Kasturi as Kasturi Sabbarwal
2009Ratan Rajput for Agle Janam Mohe Bitiya Hi Kijo as Laali.
Avika Gor for Balika Vadhu as Anandi
Hina Khan for Yeh Rishta Kya Kehlata Hai as Akshara Singhania
Parul Chauhan for Sapna Babul Ka...Bidaai as Ragini Rajvansh
Tina Dutta for Uttaran as Ichha

2010s

2010Ragini Khanna for Sasural Genda Phool as Suhana Kashyap.
Hina Khan for Yeh Rishta Kya Kehlata Hai as Akshara Singhania
Tina Dutta for Uttaran as Ichha
Ankita Lokhande for Pavitra Rishta as Archana Deshmukh
Ratan Rajput for Agle Janam Mohe Bitiya Hi Kijo as Laali
Parul Chauhan for Sapna Babul Ka...Bidaai as Ragini Rajvansh
Natasha Sharma for Na Aana Is Des Laado as Sia Sanghwan
Pooja Gor for Mann Kee Awaaz Pratigya as Pratigya
2012Giaa Manek for Saath Nibhaana Saathiya as Gopi Modi.
Ankita Lokhande for Pavitra Rishta as Archana Deshmukh
Hina Khan for Yeh Rishta Kya Kehlata Hai as Akshara Singhania
Pratyusha Banerjee for Balika Vadhu as Anandi Singh
Sakshi Tanwar for Bade Achhe Lagte Hain as Priya Kapoor
Shweta Tiwari for Parvarrish – Kuchh Khattee Kuchh Meethi as Sweety Ahluwalia
2013Deepika Singh for Diya Aur Baati Hum as Sandhya Rathi.
Sanaya Irani for Iss Pyaar Ko Kya Naam Doon? as Khusi Raizada
Drashti Dhami for Madhubala – Ek Ishq Ek Junoon as Madhubala Kundra
Sakshi Tanwar for Bade Achhe Lagte Hain as Priya Kapoor
Shweta Tiwari for Parvarrish – Kuchh Khattee Kuchh Meethi as Sweety Ahluwalia
Avika Gor for Sasural Simar Ka as Roli Bharadwaj
Kratika Sengar for  Punar Vivaah as Aarti Sindhia
2014Divyanka Tripathi for Yeh Hai Mohabbatein as Dr. Ishita Bhalla.
Sanaya Irani for Rangrasiya as Parvati
Drashti Dhami for Madhubala – Ek Ishq Ek Junoon as Madhubala Kundra
Deepika Singh for Diya Aur Baati Hum as Sandhya Rathi
Toral Rasputra for Balika Vadhu — Kachchi Umar Ke Pakke Rishte as Anandi
 Pooja Sharma for Mahabharat as Draupadi
Paridhi Sharma for Jodha Akbar as Jodha
Jennifer Winget for Saraswatichandra as Kumud Desai
2015Sriti Jha for Kumkum Bhagya as Pragya Arora & Devoleena Bhattacharjee for Saath Nibhaana Saathiya as Gopi Modi.
Divyanka Tripathi for Yeh Hai Mohabbatein as Dr. Ishita Bhalla
Pallavi Kulkarni for Itna Karo Na Mujhe Pyar as Ragini Khanna
Deepika Singh for Diya Aur Baati Hum as Sandhya Rathi
Toral Rasputra for Balika Vadhu as Anandi Shekhar
Dipika Kakar for Sasural Simar Ka as Simar Bhardwaj
2019Jennifer Winget for Bepannah as Zoya Siddiqui
Surbhi Chandna for Ishqbaaaz as Annika Trivedi
Aditi Sharma for Silsila Badalte Rishton Ka as Mauli Malhotra
Erica Fernandes for Kasautii Zindagii Kay as Prerna Sharma
Drashti Dhami for Silsila Badalte Rishton Ka as Nandini Thakur
Divyanka Tripathi for Yeh Hai Mohabbatein as Ishita Bhalla
Shraddha Arya for Kundali Bhagya as Preeta Arora
Rubina Dilaik for Shakti - Astitva Ke Ehsaas Ki as Soumya Singh
Shivangi Joshi for Yeh Rishta Kya Kehlata Hai as Naira Goneka
Adaa Khan for Vish Ya Amrit: Sitara as Sitara Bansal 
Surbhi Jyoti for Naagin 3 as Bela Sehgal
Sriti Jha for Kumkum Bhagya as Pragya Mehra
Nia Sharma for Ishq Mein Marjawan as Aarohi Kashyap

2020s
2020Surbhi Chandna for Naagin 5 as Bani  Singhania
Shraddha Arya for Kundali Bhagya as Preeta Luthra	
Rupali Ganguly for Anupamaa as Anupamaa Shah
Helly Shah for Ishq Mein Marjawan 2 as Riddhima Raisinghania	
2021Rupali Ganguly for Anupamaa as Anupamaa Shah
 Shivangi Khedkar for Mehndi Hai Rachne Waali as Pallavi Rao
Ashi Singh for Meet: Badlegi Duniya Ki Reet as Meet Ahlawat	
Helly Shah for Ishq Mein Marjawan 2 as Riddhima Raisinghania	
 Mallika Singh for RadhaKrishn as  Radha

Jury Award

2003Shweta Tiwari for Kasautii Zindagii Kay as Prerna Basu.
2005Juhi Parmar for Kumkum – Ek Pyara Sa Bandhan as Kumkum Wadhwa.
2006Shweta Tiwari for Kasautii Zindagii Kay as Prerna Basu.
2007Smriti Irani for Virrudh as Vasudha.
2008Not Awarded
2009Not Awarded
2010Avika Gor for Balika Vadhu as Anandi Singh.
2011Not Awarded
2012Sakshi Tanwar for Bade Achhe Lagte Hain as Priya Kapoor.
Ragini Khanna for Sasural Genda Phool as Suhana Kashyap
 Shweta Tiwari for Parvarrish as Sweety Ahluwalia
 Kritika Kamra for Kuch Toh Log Kahenge as Arohi
2013Surekha Sikri for Balika Vadhu as Kalyani Devi.
Sonarika Bhadoria for Devon Ke Dev...Mahadev as Parvati
Nia Sharma for Ek Hazaaron Mein Meri Behna Hai as Manvi Vadhera
Harshita Ojha for Ek Veer Ki Ardaas...Veera as Veera Singh
Sakshi Tanwar for Bade Achhe Lagte Hain as Priya Kapoor
2014Jennifer Winget for Saraswatichandra as Kumud Desai.
Surekha Sikri for Balika Vadhu as Kalyani Devi
Sakshi Tanwar for Bade Achhe Lagte Hain as Priya Kapoor
Mandira Bedi for 24 as Nikita Rai
Krystle D'Souza for Ekk Nayi Pehchaan as  Sakshi Modi
2015Not Awarded
2019Divyanka Tripathi for Yeh Hai Mohabbatein as Ishita Bhalla

References

Indian Telly Awards